The German Rugby Union Championship was established in 1909 and has since been played, with exceptions, annually. It is the highest competition in Germany in the sport of Rugby Union.

History

Men
The German Rugby Federation, the DRV was formed on 4 November 1900 in Kassel.

The first final of the German championship was played on 14 November 1909 in Stuttgart. Originally it was played between the two best teams out of the regional competitions. In 1962, a cup competition, the DRV-Pokal, was introduced, and additionally, a league cup was formed in 1983. All competitions are played annually.

In 1971, the Rugby-Bundesliga was established, from then on the two best teams out of this league would play in the final.

The TSV Victoria Linden from Hannover is the record champion, having won 20 titles so far. Until 2006, every final included a team from Hannover. Since then, in 2006, 2007 and 2008, no team from this city has reached the German final.

From 1996, a German championship in sevens rugby has been organised. This competition has been held annually since, except in 2001 and 2002.

Women
A German women's championship was established in 1988 and has been held annually since. Since 2000, the women also organise a sevens championship.

2015–16 season

Men

The top two teams in each division of the two divisions of the Bundesliga qualified for the play-offs with the semi finals held on 30 April and the final on 7 May 2016:

Women
The 2015–16 women's final was once more contested between Heidelberger RK and SC Neuenheim and held on 14 May 2016 in Heidelberg, with HRK defeating Neuenheim 13–10.

Men's championship finals
Since 1909, the German rugby champions are determined by a final (except in 2001-02), nowadays held between the two top teams of the Rugby-Bundesliga:

Championship finals

Source:

Winners & Finalists
As of 2016, this is the standing in the all-time winners list of the German championship:

Winners by city
Rugby in Germany is predominantly played in Heidelberg and Hanover, which is reflected in championship wins by city (as of 2015):

Sevens rugby championship finals

Source:

Women's championship finals
Since 1988, the German women's rugby champions are determined by a final:

Championship finals

Source:

Sevens rugby championship finals

Source:

East Germany

The East German championship was held from 1952 to 1990, with the Stahl Hennigsdorf Rugby as the most successful team, winning 27 championships:

See also
 German rugby union cup

References

External links
Article on the 2008 final with pictures of the trophy
 DRV website  German rugby federation website

Rugby union competitions in Germany
1908 establishments in Germany
Rugby union